Phil Stephens (31 July 1935 – 31 December 2015) was a former  Australian rules footballer who played with St Kilda in the Victorian Football League (VFL).

Notes

External links 

1935 births
Australian rules footballers from Tasmania
St Kilda Football Club players
North Launceston Football Club players
Norwood Football Club players
2015 deaths